Kolašin Municipality is one of the municipalities of Montenegro. Located in the northeastern part of Montenegro, municipality is part and unofficial centre of Morača region, named after Morača river. The centre is town of Kolašin.

Location and tourism
Kolašin is one of the centres of Montenegro's mountain tourism. Although Žabljak is considered more attractive destination, Kolašin has the advantage of being easily accessible by road and rail. Kolašin is located on the foot of Bjelasica and Sinjajevina mountains, which offer great conditions for skiing. Because of Kolašin's altitude (954 m), the town is considered an air spa. Biogradska Gora national park is in the town's vicinity, and is considered a premium tourist attraction. The development of Kolašin as a tourist destination is bolstered by opening of Bianca Resort & Spa, a luxury resort in town's center. Kolašin is connected with rest of Montenegro by two-laned motorways. It is situated on the main road connecting Montenegro's coast and Podgorica with northern Montenegro and Serbia (E65, E80). Kolašin is also a station on Belgrade–Bar railway.

Local parliament

Population
Town of Kolašin is administrative centre of the municipality, which in 2003 had a population of 9,949. The town of Kolašin itself has 2,989 citizens.

Ethnic groups (1991 census):
Montenegrins (93.16%)
Serbs (4.34%)

Ethnic groups (2003 census):
Montenegrins (50.65%)
Serbs (44.77%)

Population of Kolašin:
March 3, 1981 - 2,439
March 3, 1991 - 2,807
November 1, 2003 - 2,989

Gallery

References

 
Municipalities of Montenegro
Kolašin